Sabinaite (Na4Zr2TiO4(CO3)4) is a rare carbonate mineral. It crystallizes in the monoclinic crystal system as colorless to white prisms within cavities. It is more typically found as powdery coatings and masses. It has a specific gravity of 3.36.

It has been found in vugs in a carbonatite sill on Montreal Island and within sodalite syenite in the alkali intrusion at Mont Saint-Hilaire in Quebec, Canada. 

It was first described in 1980 for an occurrence in the Francon quarry, Montreal Island. It is named after Ann Sabina (1930–2015), a mineralogist working for the Geological Survey of Canada.

References 
Mineral Handbook
Data from Mindat 
Webmineral data

See also

Sodium minerals
Zirconium minerals
Titanium minerals
Oxide minerals
Carbonate minerals
Monoclinic minerals
Minerals in space group 15